The Perino Model 1908 was an early machine gun of Italian origin designed earlier in 1901 by Giuseppe Perino, an engineer (Tecnico dell'Artiglieria). The gun was nonetheless adopted by the Regio Esercito and saw some use alongside the Fiat-Revelli Modello 14 and the Maxim guns. It had a unique feed mechanism, with a hopper on the side of the gun filled with up to five twenty-round clips rather than being belt fed. This allowed the loader to constantly keep the gun at maximum capacity, meaning the gun crew never had to stop to reload.

References

 McNab, Chris: Twentieth-century Small Arms, Grange Books, 2004; 
 Nevio Mantoan, Weapons and Equipment of the Italian Army in the Great War 1915-1918, Gino Rossato Editore, First Edition.  July 1996.

External links
 thedonovan.com: A picture of a World War I Alpino, with the assault version of the Perino
 Max Difilippo: Machine guns used by Italy during WW1 
 Italian Perino Machine Gun - Forgotten Weapons
 YouTube animation showing mechanism of Perino machine gun

Early machine guns
Medium machine guns
World War I machine guns
Machine guns of Italy
World War I Italian infantry weapons